Hummel (German: "bumblebee") was a self-propelled gun based on the Geschützwagen III/IV chassis and armed with a 15 cm howitzer. It was used by the German Wehrmacht during the Second World War from early 1943 until the end of the war. Its ordnance inventory designation was Sd.Kfz 165.

The full name was Panzerfeldhaubitze 18M auf Geschützwagen III/IV (Sf) Hummel, Sd.Kfz. 165. On February 27, 1944, Hitler ordered the name Hummel to be dropped as it was deemed inappropriate for a fighting vehicle.

Development

The Hummel was designed in 1942 after the need for mobile artillery support for tank forces had been demonstrated during the invasion of the USSR. The self-propelled artillery already in service with the Wehrmacht had proven of limited value.

The first option considered was mounting a 10.5 cm leFH 18 howitzer on a Panzer III chassis, rejected in favour of the same gun on a Panzer IV chassis. One prototype was built.

This design was rejected in favour of mounting the more powerful 15 cm sFH 18 L/30 howitzer on the specially designed Geschützwagen III/IV, which combined  elements of both the Panzer III (driving and steering system) and Panzer IV chassis (suspension and engine). The same chassis was also used for the Nashorn tank destroyer.

The engine was moved to the centre of the vehicle to make room for an open-topped lightly armoured fighting compartment at the rear housing the gun and crew. Late models had a slightly redesigned driver compartment and front superstructure offering more room to the radio operator and driver.

Variants

Because the basic Hummel could carry only a limited amount of ammunition, the Munitionsträger Hummel ("ammunition carrier Hummel") was developed. This was basically a standard production Hummel without the howitzer (a 10 mm armour plate covering the gun mount) and with racks fitted to hold the ammunition. When necessary, these could still be fitted with the 15 cm howitzer of the normal Hummel; this could even be done as a field conversion.

By the end of the war, more than 700 Hummel had been built together with 157  ammunition carriers using the same design.

Combat history

The Hummel first participated in large scale combat at the Battle of Kursk, when some 100 served in armored artillery battalions (Panzerartillerie Abteilungen) of the Panzer divisions.  They were formed into separate heavy self-propelled artillery batteries, each with six Hummel and one ammunition carrier.

Foreign use
Romania received one unit from the Red Army after the war ended. This was assigned to the 2nd Armoured Regiment with its military registration number as U069009. It was officially known as the Hummel TAs self-propelled gun in the army's inventory. The gun could not be used because it was missing the breech's lock. It was showcased to the public in a military parade in Bucharest of 10 May 1946 with Romanian markings. All German armour in Romania was later phased out in 1950 and finally scrapped by 1954, the army deciding on the sole use of Soviet tanks and armoured fighting vehicles (AFVs) instead.

Besides Romania, Syria was also another user of the Hummel post-WWII. Five were received from France, which captured several from Germany after the war, between the late 1940s and the early 1950s, with a limited supply of main gun ammunition obtained together with the vehicles (later on, the Soviets provided these Syrian Hummels a sizeable quantity of 150mm rounds they produced domestically following WWII). These saw service against Israel up until the 1960s and all were most likely scrapped shortly afterwards.

Surviving vehicles
Six Hummel survive in museums, at the Munster Deutsches Panzermuseum, the Artillerie Schule in Idar Oberstein and the Sinsheim Auto & Technik Museum in Germany, the Musée des Blindés in Saumur, France and the Fort Sill Field Artillery Museum in Fort Sill, Oklahoma and one has been reconstructed at the Australian Armour and Artillery Museum and is awaiting the Winterketten track.

References

Sources

External links

 Achtung Panzer! profile of the Hummel 
 World War II Vehicles
 Surviving Panzer IV variants - A PDF file presenting the Panzer IV variants (Jagdpanzer IV, Hummel, Nashorn, Brummbär, StuG IV, Flakpanzer tanks and prototypes based on Pz IV) still existing in the world

World War II self-propelled artillery of Germany
150 mm artillery
Military vehicles introduced from 1940 to 1944